The 2021–22 Egyptian Premier League, also known as The WE Egyptian Premier League for sponsorship purposes, was the 63rd season of the Egyptian Premier League, the top Egyptian professional league for association football clubs, since its establishment in 1948. The season started on 25 October 2021 and is concluded on 30 August 2022. Fixtures for the 2021–22 season were announced on 12 October 2021.

Zamalek are the defending champions, having won their 13th league title in the previous season.

Teams

Eighteen teams are competing in the league - the top fifteen teams from the previous season, and three teams promoted from the Egyptian Second Division.

Venues
A total of 12 stadiums in 5 governorates were selected by clubs to host their 2021–22 home fixtures. Each club has the option to submit a reserve home venue in case of unavailability for their main home stadium.

Due to security concerns, selected matches are played on neutral ground due to high intensity. For example, fixtures between Al Ahly and Ismaily are played in Alexandria. All matches involving Al Masry are also played in the same city.

Notes

Personnel and kits

Managerial changes

Foreign players

Results

League table

Fixtures and results

Season statistics

Top goalscorers

Top assists

Hat-tricks

Clean sheets

Discipline

Player

Club

Number of teams by governorate

References

2
2021 in Egyptian sport
2022 in Egyptian sport
Egyptian Premier League
Egypt